Neighbours is an Australian television soap opera. It was first broadcast on 18 March 1985 and airs on digital channel Eleven. The following is a list of characters that appeared in the soap in 2014, by order of first appearance. All characters were introduced by the shows executive producer Richard Jasek, or by his successor Jason Herbison. The 30th season of Neighbours began airing from 6 January 2014. Kathy Carpenter, Sienna Matthews and Naomi Canning made their debut appearances in March. Will Dempier and Daniel Robinson arrived in April, while Ethan Smith began appearing in May. Paige Smith made her debut in June, while Nate Kinski arrived in August. Dakota Davies was introduced in September. October saw the debut of Rain Taylor, while Gary Canning, Ezra Hanley and Erin Rogers arrived in November.

Kathy Carpenter

Kathy Carpenter, played by Tina Bursill, made her first screen appearance on 10 March 2014. Bursill's casting was announced on 22 November 2013, while Kathy has previously been mentioned in the series. A Neighbours spokesperson confirmed that Bursill began filming her scenes in early 2014. Kathy is the former wife of established character Lou Carpenter (Tom Oliver). Bursill and Oliver previously worked with each other in the 1970s and Bursill commented "While it has been a long time between takes, it was lovely to work with Tom again and also a lot of new faces." In May 2014, Calen MacKenzie, who plays Kathy's on-screen grandson Bailey, confirmed Bursill had reprised her role as Kathy for a second guest stint. Kathy returned on 18 July 2014. Bursill reprised the role again in 2016, and returned on 4 November 2016.

Kathy comes to Ramsay Street to visit her daughter Lauren (Kate Kendall). Kathy is the only other person who knew Lauren had been pregnant with Brad Willis's (Kip Gamblin) child and she helped her daughter to hide the pregnancy. Executive producer Jason Herbison commented that during her visit, Kathy would deliver news that will rock the Turner and Willis households, setting the stage for "some major fireworks throughout the year." Bursill later said that Kathy would shock Lauren when she reveals her child is alive and added "Kathy had been trying to protect her daughter by concealing the truth." Daniel Kilkelly from Digital Spy also reported that Kathy would clash with Lou.

Lauren calls Kathy to say that she is going to tell her husband, Matt (Josef Brown), and Brad Willis about the baby she gave birth to twenty years ago. Kathy arrives in Erinsborough to see Lauren and instantly clashes with her former husband Lou. Lauren intervenes to say Kathy is staying with them. She then takes her mother to see her coffee shop and they discuss the phone call. Kathy tells Lauren that she should keep quiet about the baby. Kathy's youngest grandson, Bailey (Calen Mackenzie), tries to get to the bottom of his grandparents' issues and sits them both down to talk. With Lauren determined to tell Matt about the baby, Kathy admits that the baby was not stillborn and is still alive. Lauren is devastated by Kathy's revelation. Kathy goes on to explain that the baby was adopted out. Lauren is unable to forgive Kathy and asks her to leave. Kathy stays at Lassiter's Hotel, where she meets Brad's wife, Terese (Rebekah Elmaloglou). Kathy tells Terese that she is stopping Lauren from trying to find her daughter. Kathy then informs Bailey and Amber (Jenna Rosenow) about their half-sister, leading to a confrontation with Lou. He asks Kathy to leave, as she is making things worse. However, Kathy stays and buys Number 32 for Lauren. Lauren accepts Kathy's offer on behalf of the children. She then asks her mother to stay away from her family and Kathy leaves town.

Several months later, Lauren invites Kathy back to Erinsborough for Amber and Bailey. She is surprised when, after reconciling over the phone, Kathy makes a sudden arrival, and tells her to book at a room at Lassiter's. Kathy clashes with Terese and Lauren's employee, Paige Smith (Olympia Valance). When Paige shows an interest in Kathy's homeware business, she apologises for her earlier behaviour and Kathy agrees to mentor her. Paige learns that Kathy has hired a private investigator to search for her granddaughter. Paige asks Kathy to abandon the search for Lauren's sake, but Kathy goes ahead with it. Paige later sees Kathy taking some medication and Kathy tells her she has a heart condition. Kathy's private investigator informs her that her granddaughter has been found in Canberra. Kathy meets with Megan Dennison (Stefanie Jones), but she is not happy when Paige interrupts them. Megan later leaves and sends Kathy a text saying the meeting was a mistake. Kathy becomes suspicious of Paige and starts asking around about her. While they are out driving, Kathy goes through Paige's bag and finds a sketch pad with drawings of the Turners and Willises. Kathy realises Paige is the granddaughter she has been searching for, and she has a heart attack causing her to lose control of the car, which then hits Toadfish Rebecchi (Ryan Moloney). Kathy's scarf becomes caught in the door, strangling her. Paige frees her and Kathy and Toadie are taken to the hospital, where Kathy undergoes surgery. When she wakes up, Kathy tells Matt that Paige is Lauren's daughter. Kathy abandons her plans to open a store in Erinsborough and she decides to return to Queensland.

Kathy returns to Erinsborough ahead of Lauren's wedding. Lou follows shortly after and they are hostile towards one another. Kathy explains to Lauren that she and Lou had sex, but when she woke up, Lou had gone. They later learn that Lou thought Kathy had ordered him to leave, but she was actually talking to the cat. They decide not to get back together and Kathy leaves for Brisbane. She returns for the wedding, where she and Lou realise that they still have feelings for each other. They reconcile and hold a small ceremonial vow renewal. They then leave Erinsborough in Lauren and Brad's wedding camper van.

Sienna Matthews

Sienna Matthews, played by Sarah Roberts, made her first screen appearance on 21 March 2014. Roberts previously appeared in Neighbours as Clare Henderson (2010) and Jess Walker (2011), while Sienna first appeared in Brennan on the Run, a series of webisodes that focused on Mark Brennan's (Scott McGregor) time in witness protection. Sienna arrived in town to win Mark back and she immediately confronted his former girlfriend Kate Ramsay (Ashleigh Brewer). Kate assumed Mark has invited Sienna to Ramsay Street because he wanted to get back together with her. However, Brennan told Sienna that he was still in love with Kate and a "furious" Sienna demands that Kate stay away from Mark. When Sienna moved in with Mark, TV Week's Rebecca Lake commented, "After an unwelcome kiss from Sienna, Brennan now realises what we've known since last week. Yep, it's time to kick his crazy ex out!" Another TV Week contributor branded Sienna "loopy", "unstable" and a "psycho".

After arriving in Erinsborough, Sienna breaks into Mark's house, surprising both him and Kate Ramsay. Sienna wants to get back together with Mark, but he rejects her as he is in love with Kate. Sienna confronts Kate and asks her to tell Mark that she does not love him. Sienna then speaks with Mark and tells him about the conversation with Kate. She declares her love for Mark, but he rejects her advances again. Paul Robinson (Stefan Dennis) encourages Sienna to stay and fight for Mark. A couple of weeks later, Sienna breaks into Mark's house again and sees that he has bought an engagement ring for Kate. Sienna tries to tell Mark that Kate does not love him, but Mark reveals that he and Kate are back together. Sienna becomes a suspect in Kate's murder after she is found to have given a false alibi. When Sienna claims she has been fired and kicked out of her house, Mark allows her to stay with him. Sienna helps Mark to go through Kate's things and she kisses him. Mark asks her to leave, but changes his mind when Sienna tells him she has no where else to go. Sienna then goes away for a few days to give him space. On her return, Mark confronts Sienna with a threatening note she wrote to Kate before her death. Sienna is questioned by the police, but she maintains that she did not shoot Kate. A taxi driver then comes forward to back up Sienna's alibi. Mark tells Sienna to go back home and she wishes him luck in finding Kate's killer.

Naomi Canning

Naomi Canning, played by Morgana O'Reilly, made her first screen appearance on 25 March 2014. The character was teased in an October 2013 interview by cast member Colette Mann, who plays Naomi's estranged mother Sheila. Mann commented that the actress was in the process of being cast, while on-screen, Sheila revealed that she had a bad relationship with her youngest daughter. O'Reilly's casting was announced on 30 December 2013. She filmed her first scenes the previous month. Of her casting, she stated "When I was offered the role, I reverted back to my teenage self and was jumping and squealing. I was so excited." O'Reilly said Naomi was a lot of fun, but would be hiding some secrets from her mother. Shortly before her arrival, it was confirmed that Naomi would test one of the show's established relationships, after she sets her sights on a married man.

Will Dempier

Will Dempier, played by Christian Heath, made his first screen appearance on 8 April 2014. The character and Heath's casting was announced on 7 April 2014. Heath began filming three months prior to his casting announcement. He told the Buckinghamshire Advertiser's Camilla Goodman that he was "ecstatic" when he learned that he had won the part of Will. He landed the role after seeing the casting director at Neighbours just once. Heath did not need to perfect an Australian accent for the part and he explained, "When I initially read the sides, I could see this character as English and created a whole backstory that he was from England. I auditioned in my natural accent and luckily got it, they never asked me to change."

Will was introduced as a love interest for established character Chris Pappas (James Mason). Will is a nurse who works at the local hospital. Chris notices Will during his stay in the hospital, after he is attacked. Digital Spy's Daniel Kilkelly said there would be "an instant spark between Chris and Will when they first meet", which leaves Chris with a tough decision whether to break up with his boyfriend Hudson Walsh (Remy Hii) or not. Heath reprised his role in 2017.

Will fetches a pair of crutches for Chris Pappas when he comes into the hospital with a knee injury. Will is later assigned to care for Chris following surgery. Chris has a reaction to the analgesic and flirts outrageously with Will. The following day, Chris apologises to Will, who laughs it off and then gives Chris his number. Will discovers Chris has a boyfriend and tells him that his boyfriend should be by his side, but Chris tells him it is complicated. Will and Chris arrange to meet up for a drink, but Chris cancels at the last minute. He is later admitted to hospital with a blood clot in his leg and Will helps to prep him for a procedure. Chris apologises for leading Will on and tells him about his boyfriend, Hudson, who is in jail. When Will learns from Georgia Brooks (Saskia Hampele) that Chris and Hudson have broken up, he calls on Chris to see if he wants to talk. However, Chris tells Will that he cannot deal with him right now and shuts the door in his face. Will helps Georgia and Chris plant some trees at the local high school. Chris flirts with Will and later asks him on a date. After some initial cold feet from Chris, he and Will being dating. Will and Chris bring their dogs, Napoleon and Bossy, to meet, but Napoleon bites Bossy's leg, which needs treating by a vet. When Will and Chris later meet up, Will refuses to accept responsibility and apologise, so Chris breaks up with him.

Three years later, Will flirts with David Tanaka (Takaya Honda), while David is a patient at the hospital. David and Will share a coffee, but Will is later hostile towards David and reveals that someone has reported him for acting inappropriately with a patient, so he has been placed on night shifts. Will blames David, but Paul Robinson (Stefan Dennis) later admits that he made the complaint. David invites Will out for a drink, and explains that he has only just come out and is nervous. Will walks David home and they kiss. Aaron Brennan (Matt Wilson) overhears Will talking on the phone about how inexperienced David is, and Aaron warns him to stay away from David.

Daniel Robinson

Daniel Robinson, played by Tim Phillipps, made his first screen appearance on 29 April 2014. Daniel has been referred to during several episodes, but had not been seen on-screen before. The character's introduction was confirmed on 2 December 2013. The casting department held auditions for the role and producers stated that Daniel would need to resemble his on-screen parents Scott (Jason Donovan) and Charlene Robinson (Kylie Minogue). On 20 April 2014, a reporter for The Australian confirmed Phillipps had been cast in the role. Daniel comes to Erinsborough to see where his parents met and fell in love. He also catches up with his uncle Paul Robinson (Stefan Dennis). Phillipps described his character as "your happy-go-lucky, hippie-at-heart nature boy" and stated that Daniel would not arrive with any secrets or baggage. While a reporter for The Australian said he would clash with Paul and find romance on Ramsay Street.

Ethan Smith

Ethan Smith, played by Matthew Little, made his first screen appearance on 27 May 2014. The character and Little's casting was announced on 6 May 2014. Before Little filmed his guest stint with the show, he asked his brother-in-law, actor Dan Ewing, for advice. Little commented "Dan was great and obviously knows the pace you work at on a weekly drama. I had so much fun filming, and everyone was awesome to me and really made me feel welcome." Ethan was billed as being "mysterious" and having a connection to one of the show's regular characters. Ethan will try to keep the connection a secret, but he also finds time for romance.

Ethan meets Brad Willis (Kip Gamblin) when he comes looking for his daughter, who was adopted. Ethan listens to Brad's story and then tells him that he must have got the wrong Smiths, as he was an only child. Brad leaves his business card with Ethan and when he has gone, Ethan makes a phone call to his sister Paige (Olympia Valance), telling her that her biological parents have tracked her down. After Paige goes to Erinsborough to see her parents, she calls Ethan to inform him of her progress. Ethan comes to Erinsborough as he is worried about Paige. Paige tells her brother about her family and Ethan encourages her to come clean.

Ethan meets Imogen Willis (Ariel Kaplan) and is attracted to her, but Paige warns him off. Ethan flirts with Imogen at a party and she kisses him. They exchange numbers and Imogen later skips school to meet up with Ethan, causing her to lose her school captaincy. Brad comes looking for Ethan and he hides from him. Ethan tries again to get Paige to tell her family the truth about her identity. However, Paige urges him to go home as his presence is risking her secret. Ethan says goodbye to Imogen, before he leaves. A few weeks later, Ethan returns to Erinsborough when Paige begins investigating Kathy Carpenter (Tina Bursill), Lauren's mother. Seeing that she is becoming obsessive, Ethan encourages her to come and live with him in Ibiza for a year to consider her options. She declines, and he leaves for Ibiza.

Paige Smith

Paige Smith (previously Novak), played by Olympia Valance, made her first screen appearance on 2 June 2014. The character and casting was announced on 9 March 2014. Paige marks Valance's first acting role and she won the part after a lengthy audition process, which included multiple call-backs. Valance described her character as being "cool and sexy and a bit edgy". She thought viewers would love Paige, especially as she is not mean. Series producer Jason Herbison thought Valance was "the perfect fit for Paige" and called the character "fiery". Paige was revealed to be the daughter of Lauren Carpenter (Kate Kendall) and Brad Willis (Kip Gamblin). When Paige learned that her biological parents were looking for her, her curiosity was piqued and she decided to go to Erinsborough to learn more about them. Paige initially decided to keep her identity a secret.

Nate Kinski

Nate Kinski, played by Meyne Wyatt, made his first screen appearance on 18 August 2014. The character and Wyatt's casting was announced on 20 July 2014. The actor relocated to Melbourne where Neighbours is filmed. Wyatt is the first indigenous actor to join the regular cast of the show since it began in 1985. Executive producer Jason Herbison told Elissa Blake from The Sydney Morning Herald that the decision to cast an indigenous actor was "unintentional" and that Wyatt was the best actor for the role. Nate is "loosely linked" to Susan (Jackie Woodburne) and Karl Kennedy (Alan Fletcher), as Susan was once married to his uncle Alex Kinski (Andrew Clarke). Meyne said his character would be "misunderstood at times, but his heart is in the right place." The actor also said that a challenging storyline would reveal the truth behind Nate's unusual behaviour.

Dakota Davies

Dakota Davies, played by Sheree Murphy, made her first screen appearance on 19 September 2014. The character and Murphy's casting was announced on 16 June 2014. The actress has previously appeared on two British soap operas and commented that she was "excited" to be returning to work. Murphy said, "It's just kicked in that it's actually happening. I'm going back to work. The kids don't remember me on Emmerdale, so they're excited about seeing mummy on TV. The last thing I did was Hollyoaks and I was really nervous. I feel a bit like that on Neighbours, not necessarily because they watch English soaps but more because it's, 'Oh, that's Harry Kewell's wife – what's she doing?'" Murphy also said that she had watched Neighbours since the beginning and was very happy to be part of the cast, calling it "unbelievable." Murphy spent six weeks filming the recurring role. Murphy later said she would be open to a longer stint with Neighbours, as she and her husband were thinking of moving to Australia permanently.

Dakota is a British businesswoman and a former partner of one of the show's regular male characters. Sophie Dainty from Digital Spy added that Dakota has not fully recovered from their break-up. It was later revealed that Dakota has a history with Paul Robinson (Stefan Dennis). Murphy also said that Dakota would have a fling with another character during her time in Erinsborough. The actress described her character as being worldly, "strong-willed" and "one of these characters where if she sees something she likes, she will just go for it – she doesn't care." Murphy added that she liked playing someone different from herself. Melissa Field from TV Week enjoyed seeing Murphy on Neighbours and branded her character "fiery".

On 5 October 2017, it was confirmed that Murphy had reprised her role, after she was photographed filming scenes for the show in London, alongside Tim Kano who plays Leo Tanaka. Of her return, Murphy stated, "I am so excited to be joining the cast of Neighbours once again! It's even more special that it's on British soil. Dakota is such a fun, sassy character to play and I am interested to see what she is up to three years on." Dakota returned for one episode on 26 March 2018.

After arriving in Erinsborough, Dakota goes to The Waterhole where she slaps and kisses Paul Robinson. When Paul catches up with Dakota, he explains that a brain tumour affected his memory and he is not sure who she is. They bond when she explains their past; he abandoned her in South America, and when his deputy, Carlos, took over the business, Dakota entered a romantic relationship with him. However, he was involved in dodgy deals and when Dakota accidentally gave information to the authorities, she fled the area, fearful of Carlos' reaction. Paul offers her a room at the Lassiter's Hotel, and she phones Carlos, revealing that she has returned to scam Paul into buying them a bar. Although initially having his doubts, Paul agrees, eager to impress her. She bumps into Mark Brennan (Scott McGregor) in the Waterhole and flirts with him. Paul shows Dakota the location for the bar at a disused radio station, and she decides that she wants to employ his nephew, Daniel (Tim Phillipps) to work in the bar. Dakota uses the bar as a front for a diamond smuggling ring. The diamonds are hidden in shipments of coffee beans, which Dakota puts in Daniel's name. She continues to flirt with Brennan and later kisses him, which angers his girlfriend, Paige (Olympia Valance), who then tips a drinks over Dakota's laptop. Paul also becomes jealous of Dakota flirting with Brennan. Dakota assures Paul that she is only interested in him. When a new shipment of diamonds come in, Dakota asks Paul to sign for them, after Daniel is arrested for jay walking. Dakota learns that Brennan used to be a detective and she tells Paul not to worry about the shipment. The police launch a sting operation and find the diamonds, while Dakota disappears. She later returns to blackmail Paul into giving her $10,000 to leave the country. Four years later, Paul's son, Leo Tanaka (Tim Kano), meets with Dakota to investigate a fire in a factory in São Paulo that killed Rafael Humphreys' (Ryan Thomas) mother. Leo pretends he is meeting with Dakota for a business meeting and Dakota explains that she and Paul were business partners in São Paulo. Dakota gets suspicious of Leo after seeing that he has a call from Lassiter's. Leo eventually reveals that he is Paul's son, before trying to force Dakota to tell him the truth by threatening her with a USB containing emails from her regarding stolen diamonds. When Leo becomes distracted, Dakota manages to take the USB and run off. It is later discovered that Dakota started the fire for compensation from her insurance company.

Sharon Canning

Sharon Canning, played by Natasha Herbert, made her first appearance on 6 October 2014. Herbert was introduced as the mother of Kyle Canning (Chris Milligan), who comes to Erinsborough for his wedding to Georgia Brooks (Saskia Hampele). Following Herbert's one episode stint in 2014, Milligan and Colette Mann (who plays Sheila Canning) asked producers to bring her back for a longer stint, noting that "there could be so much storyline material if she came back just for a few weeks." Producers reintroduced Sharon on-screen the following year. Herbert reprised the role in 2022, as Sharon returns for Kyle's wedding to Roxy Willis (Zima Anderson). Sharon returned on 19 January in Australia and 17 January in the UK. Herbert said that Sharon would be staying in Erinsborough "for a good time, but not a long time." In an interview posted on the serial's social media accounts, Herbert explained that Sharon is more fond of Roxy than Georgia, and Milligan later joked about Sharon's persona, saying that Sharon "just comes for the free alcohol".

Sharon visits her son, Kyle Canning, before his wedding and later watches over the ceremony in which he and Georgia Brooks are married. After talking to Matt Turner (Josef Brown) at the reception about her relationship troubles, Sharon puts her hotel key in his pocket and tells him she is leaving the following day. Five months later, Sharon returns to visit Kyle and runs into Matt again. They share a drink and Matt goes back to Sharon's hotel room, but Terese Willis (Rebekah Elmaloglou) stops Matt from taking things further. Sharon later returns to town after learning of Matt's death. Terese tells her to stay away from Matt's wife, Lauren (Kate Kendall), but Sharon goes to see her. Before she can tell Lauren about her and Matt, Terese interrupts and takes Sharon away. She later sends Sharon on a cruise. After learning the truth about Matt's affair, Lauren confronts Sharon. She tells Lauren that Terese bought her off with a cruise, and that Terese wants Lauren to stay away from her husband. Seven years later, Sharon returns for Kyle's second wedding to Roxy Willis, Terese's niece, and helps the bridal party with their preparations. Despite noticing the flirtation between Glen Donnelly (Richard Huggett) and Roxy's mother, Gemma Willis (Beth Buchanan), she has sex with Glen in the honeymoon suite the night before the wedding, where they are caught by Terese and Gemma. Sharon later attends the wedding ceremony, where she continues to spend most of her time with Glen and returns to the hotel with him again afterwards, which Terese witnesses.

Rain Taylor

Rain Taylor, played by Airlie Dodds, made her first screen appearance on 29 October 2014. Dodds's casting was announced on 20 October 2014 and the role marks her television debut. The character has been previously mentioned on-screen, as Rain is Daniel Robinson's (Tim Phillipps) ex-girlfriend. Following her arrival in Erinsborough, Rain causes trouble for Daniel and his fiancée Amber Turner (Jenna Rosenow). Of Rain, Dodds stated "She is a shades of grey character because some of her actions are quite justified, but then others are so wrong. There is spookiness about her which makes playing her a lot of fun as well." Dodds later said Rain was "good-natured" and a little narcissistic.

Rain comes to Erinsborough to visit her former boyfriend, Daniel Robinson. Rain tells Daniel that she is homeless due to the closure of the community where they lived. She meets Daniel's fiancée Amber Turner, who is initially threatened by her until Rain reveals she has a boyfriend, one of Daniel's old friends Wolfie. Rain plans to establish a new community, called New Eden, in Erinsborough and speaks to Daniel's uncle Paul (Stefan Dennis) about purchasing some land. Although initially clashing with Amber at times, she convinces her of some of her hippy ways and they become friends. Rain shows her volatile side when Daniel shifts his focus from New Eden to the bar he is opening, but apologises afterwards, and begins to counsel Amber on the ways of being sustainable, like going dumpster diving. She confesses she is having problems with Wolfie, and fears he is cheating on her. However, Wolfie tells Daniel that he and Rain broke up weeks ago as she cheated on him. Amber's mother Lauren (Kate Kendall) worries about Rain's influence on Amber due to her past experience with a religious cult. Rain's plan to establish New Eden is halted when Lauren lodges an objection with the council and urges other business owners to do so too. Rain decides to head up to the Mornington Peninsula to check out a site there, and Amber announces that she and Daniel will be going with her. Amber comes to Rain for another guided meditation, and Rain uses the opportunity to manipulate Amber into breaking up with Daniel. Rain later kisses Daniel, telling him that he does not belong with Amber. He realises that she has been manipulating him and Amber. Amber and Daniel confront Rain, and she tells them that they do not belong together, before she leaves Erinsborough.

Gary Canning

Gary Canning, played by Damien Richardson, made his first screen appearance on 7 November 2014. The character and casting was announced on 15 October 2014. Gary is the estranged father of Kyle Canning (Chris Milligan). Prior to his reappearance, he had not seen his son for sixteen years, having walked out on him when he was eight years old. Milligan said Kyle was unsure whether "to hit him or hug him" when they were reunited. Gary was also reunited with his mother Sheila (Colette Mann) and his sister Naomi (Morgana O'Reilly) during his time in Erinsborough. In October 2015, it was confirmed that Richardson had returned to filming and Gary returned in early 2016. He returned again from 14 June 2016, this time in a permanent capacity, remaining in the series until February 2020, when the character was killed off.

Ezra Hanley

Ezra Hanley, played by Steve Nation, made his first screen appearance on 19 November 2014. Nation's casting was announced on the same day. He had previously spent twenty years auditioning for roles on Neighbours and Home and Away, so he was "thrilled" to be given a role on the show. He commented "As an actor it's an honour and a privilege to be on Neighbours. It's kind of where everyone who's anyone has been before. Hopefully, it's the game changer in my career. I've been acting for 20 years but this is another stepping stone." Nation said his character would "stir things up a little" and confirmed that following his initial guest stint, he would return to filming in February 2015.

Paul Robinson (Stefan Dennis) contacts Ezra and invites him to Lassiter's Erinsborough to help his former colleague Terese Willis (Rebekah Elmaloglou) organise a festival. Ezra soon questions Paul as to why he flew him over, believing that Paul wants him to come between Terese and her husband Brad (Kip Gamblin). Ezra later agrees to go for a drink with Terese. He decides to delay his return to Perth and he takes Terese out to dinner. While they are working in her room, they almost kiss, but Terese realises she still loves her husband, and asks Ezra to leave. However, he locks the door and attempts to assault Terese, causing her to forcefully eject him from the room. Ezra is fired, and he decides to sue both Terese and Paul. Both Paul and Brad threaten Ezra, and Terese later finds him badly beaten. After he is treated, Ezra drops the lawsuits and leaves town. It soon emerges that Paul paid Gary Canning (Damien Richardson) to attack Ezra.

The following year, the Quill Group purchases Lassiter's Erinsborough from Paul and sends their acquisitions manager, Ezra, to check it out. Soon after he arrives, Ezra is confronted by Terese. Ezra conducts an efficiency evaluation and clashes with Gary's mother, Sheila (Colette Mann). He reduces Terese's responsibilities at the hotel and demotes her to receptionist. Ezra continues to make things difficult for Terese and after he makes a suggestive comment, she quits her job. Ezra demotes Sheila and hires Nate Kinski (Meyne Wyatt) as trainee bar manager at The Waterhole. Brad tries to ask Ezra about his son, Clem (Max Whitelaw), but Ezra shuts him down and complains to Susan Kennedy (Jackie Woodburne). He later warns Brad to stay away from Clem. After Nate complains about Sheila, Ezra invites him for a drink and he tells him about the redevelopment plans for The Waterhole. Terese asks Ezra about Clem's behaviour and if it has anything to do with his ex-girlfriend Chloe Jones (Gaby Seow). Clem later tells Susan that his father assaulted Chloe. After Clem returns to Perth, Ezra angrily confronts Terese. Ezra is arrested when Chloe makes a formal complaint against him. Terese tells Ezra that his contract has been suspended and Quill have hired her to be the new manager of operations for Lassiter's.

Erin Rogers

Erin Rogers, played by Adrienne Pickering, made her first screen appearance on 24 November 2014. The character and Pickering's casting was announced on 17 November 2014. Pickering said "she was a very challenging character to play because she is so different from me, which made the whole experience really enjoyable and interesting." Erin is a former friend of Sonya Mitchell (Eve Morey), who will shake up Erinsborough following her arrival. Pickering stated that Erin had "a dysfunctional upbringing" which has caused her to struggle to deal with situations rationally. Pickering added that as Erin has only known chaos in her life, her reactions to things could be jarring. Morey also explained that Erin was once Sonya's best friend in high school. Erin has been sending poison pen letters to Sonya, as she blames Sonya for her addiction to substances. Melinda Houston from The Sydney Morning Herald praise Pickering's performance as Erin and the storyline, writing "I'm actually rather enjoying the Erin plot arc, not least because Adrienne Pickering is doing such a good job (within the confines of the genre) of playing a woman on the edge. Her scenes generate genuine angst, and the unfolding of events is equally believable."

Erin breaks into Sonya Mitchell's house and knocks Mark Brennan (Scott McGregor) unconscious. She later returns and is confronted by Sonya and her husband Toadfish Rebecchi (Ryan Moloney). Erin admits to sending poison pen letter to Sonya's friends and neighbours, as she blames Sonya for her addiction to drugs and the subsequent loss of her daughter to social services. Erin is charged with assault, stalking and trespass. Toadie visits Erin at the police station and warns her to stay away from his family. A few days later, Sonya confronts Erin and then pays her bail. Sonya vows to help Erin get back on her feet and reconnect with her daughter. She takes Erin to The Waterhole, knowing there is a job available, and Sheila Canning (Colette Mann) hires Erin to collect glasses. Brennan tells Sheila that Erin sent Sonya the poison pen letters, causing Erin to quit her job. Sonya brings some food to Erin's squat on Christmas Day. Erin nearly collapses from a coughing fit, but tells Sonya to leave.

Brennan returns and convinces Erin to go to the hospital to get medication. After learning that her living conditions are making her health worse, he invites her to stay with him. Erin begins a treatment program overseen by Karl Kennedy (Alan Fletcher) and learns her daughter wants to see her. Erin borrows money from Sonya to buy a new dress. She meets with a drug dealer, but later tells Sonya that she did not make a purchase. Erin's daughter, Cat (Maleeka Gasbarri), does not come to meet her, but she later arranges another time and Erin becomes stressed. She propositions Karl in a bid to get something to calm her down. Cat's visit goes well, until she learns that Erin came to see her cricket matches, but did not speak with her. Erin writes Cat a letter and Cat returns. She and Erin bond while playing cricket. Sonya convinces Erin to ask Cat to stay a few days, and Cat agrees. The pressure becomes too much for Erin and she takes Mark's wallet and watch, before fleeing. Sonya later catches up with Erin outside a pawn shop and begs her to come back, but Erin refuses.

Others

References

External links
 Characters and cast at the Official AU Neighbours website
 Characters and cast at the Official UK Neighbours website
 Characters and cast at the Internet Movie Database

2014
, Neighbours
Neighbours characters